The 2012 Tour of the Basque Country was the 52nd running of the Tour of the Basque Country cycling stage race. It started on 2 April in Güeñes and ended on 7 April in Oñati, and consisted of six stages, including a race-concluding individual time trial. It was the ninth race of the 2012 UCI World Tour season.

The race was won by Spain's Samuel Sánchez of the  team, after winning two stages including the final stage time trial, to take the general classification on the final day. Third place was taken by 's Bauke Mollema after he finished second to Sánchez in the time trial, and gained sufficient time to move up from eleventh overnight. In the race's other classifications, Marco Pinotti of the  won the green jersey for the most points gained in intermediate sprints, while  rider Mads Christensen won the King of the Mountains classification, and  finished at the head of the teams classification.

Schedule
After the race was bailed out by Spanish bank Banco Sabadell on 5 March, race organisers announced the itinerary ten days later.

Participating teams
As the Tour of the Basque Country was a UCI World Tour event, all 18 UCI ProTeams were invited automatically and obligated to send a squad. Two other squads were given wildcard places into the race, and as such, formed the event's 20-team peloton.

The 20 teams that competed in the race were:

Stages

Stage 1
2 April 2012 — Güeñes to Güeñes, 

Two riders – 's Davide Mucelli and David de la Fuente of  – advanced clear of the main field at the  mark of the stage, as they reached the race's first categorised climb, the third-category Alto Humaran; they managed to extend their advantage to a maximum of over five minutes at one point during the early running of the stage.  and  came to the front of the peloton towards the midpoint of the stage; making their move on the Alto del Suceso, another categorised climb with de la Fuente taking the maximum points on offer. Mucelli and de la Fuente's advantage had dropped to around two-and-a-half minutes, before spanning back out to the four-minute mark with  remaining.

 then established themselves on the front of the pack; protecting their main sprinter for the race, Michael Matthews. As such, by the time the race had advanced another  of the parcours, the duo out front only held a lead of around a minute over the advancing peloton. On the final climb of the day, the Alto de San Comse, a crash in the pack delayed several riders, with the peloton momentarily stalling the pace in the mayhem. This delay allowed Wesley Sulzberger to sneak off the front; the first of several mini-attacks that were ultimately unsuccessful on the run in to Güeñes.  looked to set up the sprint finish for their rider Daniele Ratto, but he faded in the closing stages; 's Wout Poels launched his attack for the line, but he was usurped by the Spanish national champion, 's José Joaquín Rojas, who earned his first victory of 2012 at the finish.

Stage 2
3 April 2012 — Güeñes to Vitoria-Gasteiz, 

Heavy rain greeted the riders at the start of the stage, with an early climb of the third-category Alto de San Cosme coming after just  of the parcours. It was on the descent from the climb that the primary breakaway of the stage began to form; Jérôme Pineau of  went clear with 's Thibaut Pinot and  rider Mads Christensen. The trio were later joined by another pair of riders – representing the wildcard teams in the race,  and  – as Gabriele Bosisio and Julián Sánchez both ventured off the front of the peloton, eventually catching up with the breakaway after . Of the five members of the breakaway, only two – Pinot and Pineau – had finished in the same time as stage one winner, 's José Joaquín Rojas.

As such,  were driving the pace on the front of the main pack, in order to keep within a suitable distance of the five leaders; the gap at that point was around the seven-minute mark. Pinot continued to close in on David de la Fuente and the mountains classification lead, as he claimed maximum points on offer at the Alto de La Barrerilla and the Alto de Zaldiaran. ,  and  all placed riders towards the front of the peloton, to help close the gap between the leaders and themselves. The gap had been cut to just over five minutes by the time the race reached the next categorised climb, the Alto de Vitoria, with Pinot again leading the breakaway across the summit. More teams sent riders forward to help with the work to bring back the leaders, taking back four minutes from the next ; the lead quintet held an advantage of just 1' 22" at the summit of the Alto de San Martin.

Alas, the breakaway was not to succeed; with  remaining of the stage, and on the second climb of the Alto de Zaldiaran – the final climb of the stage – the peloton brought back the lead quintet, allowing more riders to try an attacking move in the closing stages, on the run-in to Vitoria-Gasteiz. With  leading the main pack, another five-man move tried to get clear on the climb itself, including one of the team's riders, Wesley Sulzberger. Nerz then attacked his companions, but all five were caught before the summit of the climb. ,  and  all had riders towards the front of the pack, many expecting a bunch sprint for the stage honours. Team-mate Allan Davis, like Impey, crossed the line arms aloft in second place ahead of 's Davide Appollonio and Rojas, who maintained his overall lead.

Stage 3
4 April 2012 — Vitoria-Gasteiz to Eibar, 

The race's queen stage consisted of seven categorised climbs over the  parcours, including two first-category climbs; the Alto de Ixua and also the climb of the Alto de Usartza, a climb with gradient in places at over 11%, cresting out with  remaining of the stage. The Usartza featured for the third successive year; Samuel Sánchez was the rider in which most observers deemed to be the favourite for the stage, as he had won each of the previous two finishes to be held in Eibar. Mini-attacks set the course for the stage as the field remained as one, for much of the first half-hour of racing; it was not until after  that the stage's primary breakaway had been formed.

By this time, the lead quintet had split into two; Herrada and Christensen had accelerated away from their companions and were later joined by Veikkanen, who had been dropped in the initial move along with Piedra and Mucelli. Christensen led over the next two categorised climbs, before Herrada accelerated his pace and attacked off the front on the first of the first-category climb of Alto de Ixua.

 were prominent in attempting to break away from the main field, utilising Alberto Losada, Giampaolo Caruso and Ángel Vicioso in a bid to get clear ahead of the finish. The gap was eighteen seconds at the final intermediate sprint point in Eibar, with  helping out with the chase, and the trio were caught at the base of the Alto de Usartza. Chris Horner then attacked with 's Robert Kišerlovski, and were joined by another  rider, Joaquim Rodríguez and 's Michele Scarponi. Sánchez bridged up to the leaders, and as Kišerlovski and Scarponi struggled, it was left to Sánchez, Rodríguez and Horner to contest for the stage honours. Sánchez attacked in the closing stages and did enough to beat Rodríguez and Horner – to win for the third successive year – with Bauke Mollema leading the chasers over the line, 12 seconds in arrears of Sánchez, who took the race lead from 's José Joaquín Rojas as Rojas lost over 16 minutes on the stage.

Stage 4
5 April 2012 — Eibar to Bera-Ibardin, 

Mini-attacks were again key to the first hour of racing on the fourth stage; with cool and damp conditions again for the riders, it was almost a carbon-copy to what had occurred on the previous stage. Evgeni Petrov was the most active rider in that first hour; after an earlier unsuccessful attempt to get clear on the first of the stage's five categorised climbs – the Alto de Itziar – at the  mark, Petrov did manage to clip clear of the peloton almost  later to initiate the breakaway move.

With the climb of the Alto de Agiña coming several kilometres later on the parcours, fresher legs for Sulzberger and Clarke told as they brought themselves, and Garciá, up to the breakaway and reforming the move as a seven-man group. Four riders attacked on the descent, although only one – Patxi Vila – was there for a move to catch the breakaway as 's Giampaolo Caruso and  pair Igor Antón and Gorka Verdugo were there to protect their respective team leaders Joaquim Rodríguez and Sánchez.

Maxime Monfort and Fränk Schleck looked to set the pace for their  team-mate Chris Horner, while Simon Špilak looked to do so for Rodríguez. 's Wout Poels and 's Sergio Henao both looked to go clear in the final kilometre, but Rodríguez prevailed comfortably in the closing stages – an 18% gradient in some places – to win by nine seconds, taking the overall lead from Sánchez, who was second ahead of Henao and 's Robert Kišerlovski.

Stage 5
6 April 2012 — Bera-Ibardin to Oñati, 

Again, rain made conditions slightly treacherous on the stage itself, and may have contributed to the fact that there were no successful attacks by the breakaway until near the midpoint of the day's running, after almost two hours of racing. Not long later, twelve other riders from nine more teams brought reinforcement to the lead quartet and soon accelerated their pace to get a gap over the main field.

The sixteen had been over five minutes clear at one point, but the bunch closed the gap quickly after that; it was 3' 15" at the summit of the stage's third climb, the Alto de Elosua. The breakaway's advantage continued to diminish and not long after the next categorised climb, the Alto de Descarga where Ulissi had led them across the summit, the move was thwarted as the peloton caught them. This move could not gain sufficient ground off the front of the field;  after the move had begun, their gap over the main field was just 25 seconds, with the pace being set by Rodríguez's team-mates.

With Kišerlovski being in a prime position overall, he then attacked off the front of the breakaway in order to preserve his position in the rankings. The pace split the remaining breakaway riders apart;  rider Marco Pinotti, 's Adriano Malori and Jesús Hernández of  chased after Kišerlovski, while the remaining five leaders surrendered back to the peloton. The top two overall caught Kišerlovski, and tried to distance themselves from him in the closing metres. Rodríguez launched his sprint first and just held off Sánchez at the line to keep his lead at nine seconds going into the time trial. Kišerlovski finished two seconds behind in third, but moved into third place overall. Chris Horner gave up 21 seconds to Kišerlovski, and 23 to Rodríguez and Sánchez, dropping to tenth overall.

Stage 6
7 April 2012 — Oñati,  individual time trial (ITT)

As was expected, the battle for the race victory came down to the final stage of the race; a technical  individual time trial around Oñati. On the parcours were three steep climbs, made tougher due to the continued unsettled weather conditions in the Basque country; damp roads greeted the riders, and the stage favourite Tony Martin – the world time trial champion – riding for the  team crashed during a reconnaissance overview of the course. As was customary of time trial stages, cyclists set off in reverse order from where they were ranked in the general classification at the end of the previous stage. Meyer recorded a time of 29' 12" for the course; a time that was ultimately good enough for him to place inside the top ten of the stage classification.

Clement's time was eventually beaten by 's Marco Pinotti, wearing the green jersey as the sprints classification leader. Pinotti, a five-time Italian champion in the discipline, recorded a similar time to Clement at the intermediate point but went quicker in the second half to end up seven seconds ahead at the finish, in a time of 29' 03".

Martin then beat that time later, becoming the first rider to break 29 minutes for the course; in a time of 28' 55", later stating that the time trial was "dangerous" in places. Bauke Mollema, a team-mate of Clement, then put in one of the strongest time trials of his career to beat Martin's time by a solitary second, having received extra guidance in his time-trialling abilities over the off-season. Mollema's performance eventually lifted him onto the podium in the general classification, after gaining sufficient time over eight riders that had been ahead of him prior to the stage. It came down to the top two overall for the race honours: Samuel Sánchez and Rodríguez. Sánchez's greater proficiency in the discipline compared to Rodríguez proved vital; although he trailed Mollema at the intermediate sprint, Sánchez repeated the feat of many other riders as a strong second half of the course gave him the stage victory, six seconds quicker than Mollema. Rodríguez also put in a strong performance, finishing 21 seconds slower than Sánchez, giving the latter victory by nine seconds overall; despite this, Rodríguez was pleased with his stage effort.

Classification leadership table
In the 2012 Tour of the Basque Country, four different jerseys were awarded. For the general classification, calculated by adding each cyclist's finishing times on each stage, the leader received a yellow jersey. This classification was considered the most important of the 2012 Tour of the Basque Country, and the winner of the classification was considered the winner of the race.

Additionally, there was a points classification, which awarded a white jersey. In the points classification, cyclists received points for finishing in the top 15 in a stage. For winning a stage, a rider earned 25 points, second place earned 20 points, third 16, fourth 14, fifth 12, sixth 10, and one point fewer per place down to a single point for 15th. There was also a mountains classification, the leadership of which was marked by a blue jersey. In the mountains classification, points were won by reaching the top of a climb before other cyclists, with more points available for the higher-categorised climbs.

The fourth jersey represented the sprints classification, marked by a green jersey. In the sprints classification, cyclists received points for finishing in the top 3 at intermediate sprint points during each stage, with the exception of the final individual time trial stage. There was also a classification for teams, in which the times of the best three cyclists per team on each stage were added together; the leading team at the end of the race was the team with the lowest total time.

References

External links

Tour of the Basque Country by year
Basque Country
Basque Country